Thomas Oliver Bennett (2 April 1852 – 8 August 1905) was an English rugby union footballer who played in the 1870s. He played at representative level for Yorkshire, and at club level for Wakefield Trinity (were a rugby union club at the time, so no Heritage No. is allocated). Prior to Tuesday 27 August 1895, Wakefield Trinity was a rugby union club.

Background
Thomas Bennett's birth was registered in Wakefield district, West Riding of Yorkshire, and his death aged 53 was registered in Wakefield district, 
West Riding of Yorkshire.

Playing career

Notable appearances
Thomas Bennett was a founder member of Wakefield Trinity and played in the club's first ever game in 1873, and he was later an honorary secretary of the club.

Change of Code
When Wakefield Trinity converted from the rugby union code to the rugby league code on Tuesday 27 August 1895, Thomas Bennett would have been 43. Subsequently, he didn't become both a rugby union and rugby league footballer for Wakefield Trinity.

Genealogical Information
Thomas Bennett was the father of Wakefield Trinity rugby league footballer who played in the 1900s Ernest Bennett, and the maternal great-grandfather of the Featherstone Rovers, and Wakefield Trinity rugby league footballer who played in the 1950s, and 1960s, Donald "Don" Metcalfe.

References

External links

Search for "Bennett" at espnscrum.com
Search for "Bennett" at rugbyleagueproject.org

1852 births
1905 deaths
English rugby union players
Rugby union players from Wakefield
Rugby league wingers
Wakefield Trinity players
Yorkshire County RFU players